Usagi Yojimbo Book 24: Return of the Black Soul is the twenty-fourth graphic novel in the ongoing Usagi Yojimbo series created by cartoonist Stan Sakai. It was published by Dark Horse Comics in 2010, collecting stories previously published in Usagi Yojimbo (vol. 3) #103–109 and a story from Free Comic Book Day 2009: Star Wars Clone Wars / Dark Horse All Ages #1.

Return of the Black Soul was published in trade paperback and limited edition hardcover (limited to 350 signed and numbered copies).

Publication details

Trade Paperback Edition 

Publication Date: July 21, 2010

Format: B&W, 192 pages, TPB, 6" x9"

Price: $16.99

Signed & Numbered Limited Hardcover Edition 

Publication Date: August 4, 2010

Format: B&W, 192 pages, HC, 6" x9"

Price: $59.99

Table of Contents 

 Introduction - Charles Soloman
 One Dark and Stormy Night
 The Darkness and the Soul
 Sparrows
 Cover Gallery
 Author Bio

Foreign Language Editions

Usagi Yojimbo 24: Powrót czarnej duszy 

Publisher: Egmont Polska Sp. z o.o.

Publication Date:  listopad 2011

Language: Polish

Usagi Yojimbo nº 24: El regreso del alma negra 

Publisher: Planeta DeAgostini

Publication Date: Julio 2012

Language: Spanish

Usagi Yojimbo Tome 24 

Publisher: Paquet

Publication Date: Août 2012

Language: French

Format: 12,5 x 18,5 cm

The Digest sized French editions of the Usagi Yojimbo books do not feature any of the individual compilation titles that are used for the original English editions, listing each book by volume number instead.

Usagi Yojimbo 24: Návrat černé duše 

Publisher: Crew

Publication Date: Září 2015

Language: Czech

References

2013 graphic novels
Usagi Yojimbo